História do Futuro  is a 2016 documentary film directed by the Italian filmmaker Enrico Masi about the impact of the 2014 World Cup and 2016 Olympic Games in Rio de Janeiro on Brazil's indigenous populations, as well as other marginalised communities. It is the second part of a trilogy of films (the first being 2012's The Golden Temple) documenting the impact of mega events on marginalised communities in large cities. The film was produced by the Caucaso Factory production company and directed by Enrico Masi. The film mainly follows two individuals and their experiences in the run up to the World Cup and then the Olympics, which culminate in the eviction and demolition of the Vila Autódromo social community and the dispossession of the Universidade Indigena, or Indigenous University, based in the Aldeia Maracanã.

The film is narrated in French by Marie Christine Elekes but is otherwise in Portuguese with English subtitles.

Title 
The film's title is taken from a 17th-century millenarianist book of the same name written by Portuguese Jesuit Antonio Vieria (1608–1697) who dedicated his life to the evangelisation of the indigenous peoples of Brazil. His book prophesied the rise of the Brazilian Empire to be the world's fifth great civilisation, after the Assyrian, Persian, Greek and Roman empires. The film references the book and its historical context to highlight the ongoing forced assimilation of Brazil indigenous communities and the marginalisation of indigenous culture.

Synopsis
The film mainly follows two individuals, Inalva Mendes Brito and Urutau Guajajara, placed at the heart of the negative impacts that resulted from the policies of the Brazilian government, FIFA and the IOC in the run up to Rio de Janeiro's World Cup and Olympic Games.

Inalva Mendes Brito is a teacher who lived in the Vila Autódromo, a semi-autonomous community that emerged in the 1970s as a result of a fishermen's colony on Rio de Janeiro's periphery merging with various groups of syndicalists who had been persecuted by the military dictatorship. The Vila Autódromo, which won the Urban Age Award for best conciliation project in 2013, was demolished in June 2015 to make way for the Olympic Park. In the film, Mendes Brito stresses the insignificance of financial compensation and the audience witness the emotional moment when she revisits the pile of rubble that used to be her home for the first time since her eviction.

Urutau Guajajara is an indigenous Brazilian linguist and figurehead of the Universidade Indigena, which is dedicated to the protection of native culture. The film follows his struggle to hold on to his indigenous identity and his eventual eviction from the Aldeia Maracanã, or Maracanã Village, home of the Indigenous University inside the former Museo do Indio (a derelict colonial palace just beside the Maracanã Stadium), prior to the World Cup.

The film also makes use of interviews with several other Brazilians, both indigenous and European, as well as footage of the Brazilian educator and philosopher, Paulo Freire, at the University of Bologna in 1989, who explores the significance of language in identity and the role of violence in the relationship between oppressed and oppressor.

Themes
História do Futuro stresses the concept of ‘neutralisation' i.e. the Brazilian government's attempts to disempower indigenous and impoverished communities via oppression and/or assimilation. As the film's title suggests, the film makes use of colonial motifs to contextualise this process, as well as juxtaposing the promised benefits of the two mega events extolled by the Brazilian authorities (most often in the form of posters), with the reality of poverty, violence and assimilation revealed by the citizens themselves.

The film also explores the role of Brazil's indigenous population in maintaining the natural environment, and the possible consequences for the Amazon if their culture were to die out.

References

Documentary films about indigenous rights
Brazilian documentary films
Italian documentary films
2016 films
2016 documentary films